The Filmoteca Española (Spanish Cinemathèque) is an official institution of the Spanish Ministry of Culture. Its objective is to restore, investigate and conserve the film heritage of Spain and its diffusion.

Sites 
Its cinema where films are daily shown is Cine Doré (filmed by Pedro Almodóvar in Hable con ella), in Santa Isabel Street, Madrid, designed by architect Críspulo Moro Cabeza and built in 1923. It was restored from 1982 to 1990. The archive, offices, library and exhibition halls are set in a restored palace on Magdalena St nº 10 in Madrid.

Filmoteca has two other venues, the CCR (Conservation and Restoration Center) in Pozuelo de Alarcón, on the outskirts of Madrid and the administrative headquarters in the Palacio de Perales in the center of the city of Madrid.

Direction 

At present the director of Filmoteca is Josetxu Cerdan, professor of Audiovisuals at UC3M.

Film collection 

The total of existing titles in the archives of the Filmoteca Española currently amounts to approximately 36,000. In addition to approximately another 12,000 pre-cataloged titles.
Of the 36,000 titles already cataloged, approximately 21,000 are of Spanish production, and the rest are foreigners.

In total 205,000 materials, both in photochemical support (about 600,000 containers) and in electronic support.

70,500 rolls of film belonging to audiovisual documents of the NO-DO archive are also stored in its vaults.

See also 
 Cinema of Spain
 List of film archives

External links
Filmoteca española

Film archives in Spain
Film organisations in Spain
FIAF-affiliated institutions